James Elmer Tays (March 10, 1899 - June 21, 1986) was an American football back who played three seasons in the National Football League with the Chicago Cardinals, Dayton Triangles, Staten Island Stapletons and Newark Tornadoes. He played college football at Pennsylvania State University and attended Tolono High School in Tolono, Illinois. Tays was also a member of the Chicago Bulls of the American Football League. He was a member of the Chicago Cardinals team that were NFL champions in 1925.

External links
Just Sports Stats
Fanbase profile

1899 births
1986 deaths
Players of American football from Chicago
American football running backs
Penn State Nittany Lions football players
Chicago Cardinals players
Chicago Bulls (American football) players
Dayton Triangles players
Staten Island Stapletons players
Newark Tornadoes players